In mathematics, a null semigroup (also called a zero semigroup) is a semigroup with an absorbing element, called zero, in which the product of any two elements is zero. If every element of a semigroup is a left zero then the semigroup is called a left zero semigroup; a right zero semigroup is defined analogously.
According to Clifford and Preston, "In spite of their triviality, these semigroups arise naturally in a number of investigations."

Null semigroup
Let S be a semigroup with zero element 0. Then S is called a null semigroup if xy = 0 for all x and y in S.

Cayley table for a null semigroup

Let S = {0, a, b, c} be (the underlying set of) a null semigroup. Then the Cayley table for S is as given below:

Left zero semigroup

A semigroup in which every element is a left zero element is called a left zero semigroup. Thus a semigroup S is a left zero semigroup if xy = x for all x and y in S.

Cayley table for a left zero semigroup

Let S = {a, b, c} be a left zero semigroup. Then the Cayley table for S is as given below:

Right zero semigroup

A semigroup in which every element is a right zero element is called a right zero semigroup. Thus a semigroup S is a right zero semigroup if xy = y for all x and y in S.

Cayley table for a right zero semigroup

Let S = {a, b, c} be a right zero semigroup. Then the Cayley table for S is as given below:

Properties
A non-trivial null (left/right zero) semigroup does not contain an identity element. It follows that the only null (left/right zero) monoid is the trivial monoid.

The class of null semigroups is:
closed under taking subsemigroups
closed under taking quotient of subsemigroup
closed under arbitrary direct products. 

It follows that the class of null (left/right zero) semigroups is a variety of universal algebra, and thus a variety of finite semigroups. The variety of finite null semigroups is defined by the identity ab = cd.

See also
Right group

References

Semigroup theory